Liatongus  is a genus of dung beetles in the subfamily Scarabaeinae of the scarab beetle family. At least part of the upper surfaces are without hairs; the head and pronotal disc are generally sculptured; and the genae are rounded, with little or no indentation between the clypeus and the genae. Length ranges from 7.4 to 10.9 mm. Colours vary: they may be uniform brown or dull purple, or have red, white or yellow patterns on the elytra.

Distribution
Found in three regions: Afrotropical, Oriental to eastern Palearctic, and western Nearctic.

Taxonomy
There are 38-46 species; 17 are from Africa.

Gallery

Species
These 43 species belong to the genus Liatongus:

 Liatongus affinis (Arrow, 1908) c g
 Liatongus amitinus (Boucomont, 1921) c g
 Liatongus ancorifer Kral & Rejsek, 1999 c g
 Liatongus appositicornis Kral & Rejsek, 1999 c g
 Liatongus arrowi (Boucomont, 1921) c g
 Liatongus aterrimus (Boucomont, 1921) c g
 Liatongus bucerus (Fairmaire, 1891) c g
 Liatongus californicus (Horn, 1882) i c g b
 Liatongus clypeocornis Scheuern, 1988 c g
 Liatongus davidi (Boucomont, 1919) c g
 Liatongus denticornis (Fairmaire, 1887) c g
 Liatongus endroedii Balthasar, 1956 c g
 Liatongus femoratus (Illiger, 1800) c g
 Liatongus ferreirae Balthasar, 1964 c g
 Liatongus fulvostriatus D'Orbigny, 1916 c g
 Liatongus gagatinus (Hope, 1831) c g
 Liatongus hastatus Kral & Rejsek, 1999 c g
 Liatongus imitator Balthasar, 1938 c g
 Liatongus incurvicornis (Fairmaire, 1887) c g
 Liatongus indicus (Arrow, 1908) c
 Liatongus interruptus (Quedenfeldt, 1884) c g
 Liatongus martialis (Harold, 1879) c g
 Liatongus medius (Fairmaire, 1889) c g
 Liatongus mergacerus (Hope, 1831) c g
 Liatongus militaris (Castelnau, 1840) c g
 Liatongus minutus (Motschulsky, 1860) c
 Liatongus phanaeoides (Westwood, 1839) c g
 Liatongus pugionatus (Boheman, 1858) c g
 Liatongus raffrayi (Lansberge, 1886) c g
 Liatongus rhinoceros Arrow, 1931 c g
 Liatongus rhinocerulus (Bates, 1889) c g
 Liatongus schoutedeni (Boucomont, 1920) c
 Liatongus sjostedti (Felsche, 1904) c g
 Liatongus spathulatus (Roth, 1851) c g
 Liatongus taurus (Boucomont, 1920) c g
 Liatongus testudo (Lansberge, 1886) c g
 Liatongus triacanthus (Boucomont, 1920) c g
 Liatongus tridentatus (Boucomont, 1919) c g
 Liatongus tuberculicollis (Felsche, 1909) c g
 Liatongus upembanus Janssens, 1953 c g
 Liatongus urus (Kolbe, 1914) c g
 Liatongus venator (Fabricius, 1801) c g
 Liatongus vertagus (Fabricius, 1798) c g

Data sources: i = ITIS, c = Catalogue of Life, g = GBIF, b = Bugguide.net

References

Scarabaeinae